Smiths or Smith's may refer to:

Companies
Smith Electric Vehicles, or Smith's, a manufacturer of electric trucks
Smith's Food and Drug, or Smith's, an American supermarket chain
 Smith's Ballpark, a baseball stadium in Salt Lake City, Utah, U.S. named for the company
Smiths Group, a British engineering company
Smiths Aerospace, a former subdivision now called GE Aviation Systems
Smiths Medical, a former subdivision now part of ICU Medical
The Smith's Snackfood Company, an Australian snack food company owned by PepsiCo
WHSmith, or Smith's, a British retailer
Smiths News, a British distributor of newspapers and magazines, demerged from WHSmith

Other uses
Metalsmiths
The Smiths, an English rock band in the 1980s 
The Smiths (album), 1984
Smith's Friends, a name for Brunstad Christian Church originating in Norway
Smith's (cycling team), a Belgian professional cycling team 1966–1968
The Smiths, a 2014 sitcom pilot by Lee Mack

See also

Smith (disambiguation)
Smith Family (disambiguation)
Smiths Falls, in Ontario, Canada
Smiths Station, Alabama, U.S.
SmithZz, a French professional gamer